Scour may refer to:

Hydrodynamic processes 
 Hydrodynamic scour, the removal of sediment such as sand and silt from around an object
 Bridge scour, erosion of soil around at the base of a bridge pier or abutments via the flow of air, ice, or water
 Ice scour or ice gouge, a drifting ice feature that scrapes the seabed
 Tidal scour, erosion of substrate via tidal forces

Other 
 Scour (band), an American black metal band
 Scour Inc., a multimedia search engine
 Scouring (textiles), Scouring, cleaning wool of lanolin, vegetable matter, and other contaminants, prior to use
 Scours, a term for diarrhea, especially among cattle